Girls Without Rooms is a 1956 Swedish drama film directed by Arne Ragneborn.

Cast
 Catrin Westerlund as Fransiska Karlsson
 Inga Gill as Agneta
 Marianne Löfgren as Patient
 Lissi Alandh as Fransiska's Work Colleague (as Lissi Aland)
 Eivor Engelbrektsson as Alice Karlsson
 Sissi Kaiser as Ulla (as Sissi Kayser)
 Sif Ruud as Prostitute

References

External links
 

1956 films
1956 drama films
Swedish drama films
1950s Swedish-language films
Films directed by Arne Ragneborn
1950s Swedish films
Swedish black-and-white films